Clark’s of Hove v Bakers Union [1978] ICR 1076 is a UK labour law case, concerning the duty to consult over redundancies.

Facts
380 workers were made redundant, and they claimed there was a failure to consult. Clark’s of Hove claimed the ‘exceptional circumstance’ was that it ceased trading on 24 October 1976 after being in financial difficulty since the summer.

Judgment
The Court of Appeal held that ‘insolvency is, on its own, neither here nor there’ and particularly where, as here, there was ‘a gradual run-down of the company’.

See also

UK labour law

Notes

References

United Kingdom labour case law